Derwent derives from the Brythonic term Derventio, meaning "valley thick with oaks".  It may refer to:

Places

Australia 
 Derwent River (Tasmania)
 Derwent Valley Council, a local government area of Tasmania, Australia, covering the upper part of the Derwent River, from the major town of New Norfolk (just north-west of Hobart) to the remote south-west Hydro town of Strathgordon
 Electoral division of Derwent, Tasmania
 Derwent Barracks, an Australian Army barracks in the Hobart suburb of Glenorchy, near the Elwick Racecourse and Hobart Showgrounds

United Kingdom 
 Derwent College, a college of the University of York
 Derwent, Derbyshire, a now-submerged village.
 Derwentwater, Lake District
 River Derwent, North East England
 River Derwent, Cumbria, a river in the Lake District of the county of Cumbria in the north of England
 Above Derwent, a civil parish in the Borough of Allerdale in Cumbria, England, bounded to the east by Derwent Water, the River Derwent and Bassenthwaite Lake, and includes sections of both lakes
 River Derwent, Derbyshire, a river in the county of Derbyshire, England, joining the River Trent south of Derby
 River Derwent, Yorkshire, a river in Yorkshire in the north of England
 Sutton upon Derwent, a small village and civil parish on the River Derwent in the East Riding of Yorkshire, England, approximately 8 miles (13 km) to the south-east of York
 Derwent Ings, a Site of Special Scientific Interest (SSSI) in the East Riding of Yorkshire, England
 Upper Derwent Valley, an area of the Peak District National Park in England
 Derwent Park (Rowlands Gill)
 Derwent Reservoir, North East England, a reservoir on the River Derwent, on the border between County Durham and Northumberland.
 Derwent Mouth, a location on the River Trent, which at that point forms the border between the English counties of Derbyshire and Leicestershire
 Derwent Rural District, a rural district in the East Riding of Yorkshire from 1935 to 1974
 Newton upon Derwent, a village and civil parish in the East Riding of Yorkshire, England
 Ouse and Derwent, a wapentake of the historic East Riding of Yorkshire, England consisting of the westerly part of the county

Canada 
 Derwent, Alberta
 Derwent, Ontario

United States
 Derwent, Ohio

Vehicles 
 Derwent (locomotive), steam locomotive
 HMS Derwent, one of three warships of the Royal Navy
 HMAS Derwent, a naval base and a warship of the Royal Australian Navy

Companies 
 Derwent Cumberland Pencil Company, a manufacturer of pencils and other stationery. The business began in 1832, and is well known in Cumbria. The company was bought by Acco UK (known then as Rexel), and became a brand of their product range
 Derwent London, commercial developer in London
 Derwent Capital Markets, hedge fund in London
 Derwent Drug File, formerly known as Ringdoc, is an information monitoring, abstracting and documentation service, specifically designed to meet the information needs of people requiring information on pharmaceuticals
 Derwent Living, an independent, not-for-profit provider of affordable and specialist housing in the Midlands, Yorkshire and the South East

People
 Derwent Hall Caine (1891–1971), British actor, publisher and Labour politician
 Derwent Coleridge (1800–1883), third child of Samuel Taylor Coleridge, a distinguished English scholar and author
 Lavinia Derwent (1909–1989), MBE
 Derwent Lees (1885–1931), Australian landscape painter

Other
 Rolls-Royce Derwent, jet engine
 Derwent (patent), patent indexing system
 Baron Derwent, of Hackness in the North Riding of the County of York, is a title in the Peerage of the United Kingdom
 Derwent flounder, Taratretis derwentensis, is a flatfish of the family Pleuronectidae
 Derwent Cricket Club, established in 1835 and is the oldest cricket club in Tasmania
 Derwent Park Road, a major link road that connects the Brooker Highway to the Main Road, in the northern suburbs of Hobart, Tasmania
 Derwent Way Bridge, a small road and rail swing bridge over the Annacis Channel of the Fraser River in the Lower Mainland of British Columbia, Canada, connecting the community of Queensborough, part of New Westminster on Lulu Island, to Annacis Island in Delta
 Derwent House, on Camden Park Road, Chislehurst, Bromley, is one of a number of the locally renowned 'Willett-built' houses erected on the Camden Park Estate by high-class speculative builder William Willett in the 1900s
 Derwent Island House, an 18th-century Italianate house situated on Derwent Island, Derwent Water, Keswick, Cumbria, and in the ownership of the National Trust
 Derwent Power Station, a 214MWe gas-fired power station on Holme Lane near Spondon in Derby, England, built on the site of the former Spondon Power Station
 Derwent Tower, a 29-storey residential apartment building in Dunston, United Kingdom
 Derwent Reservoir (disambiguation)
 Derwent Valley (disambiguation)
 Derwent Valley Railway (disambiguation)
 Derwent World Patents Index
 River Derwent (disambiguation)